Kristel is both a feminine given name and a surname. Notable people with the name include:

Given name:
Kristel de Catalina (born 1985), Filipino dancer and actress
Kristel Fulgar (born 1994), Filipino actress
Kristel Köbrich (born 1985), Chilean swimmer
Kristel Leesmend (born 1968), Estonian actress
Kristel Lisberg (born 1989), Faroese singer 
Kristel Moreno (born 1991), Filipino actress and dancer
Kristel Pärtna (born 1981), Estonian opera singer
Kristel Verbeke (born 1975), Belgian singer
Kristel Viigipuu (born 1990), Estonian biathlete
Kristel Vourna (born 1992), Greek swimmer
Kristel Werckx (born 1969), Belgian racing cyclist

Surname:
 Sylvia Kristel (1952−2012), Dutch actress, model and singer

Feminine given names